Vengeful may refer to:

 Desiring revenge
 Vengeful, a British military intelligence system used in Northern Ireland